The International Racquetball Federation's 11th Racquetball World Championships were held in San Juan (Puerto Rico) from August 3 to August 10, 2002, with 32 men's national teams and 19 women's national teams; and several players in the Singles and Doubles competition.

Men's team competition

Women's team competition

Men's Singles competition

Women's Singles competition

See also
Racquetball World Championships

External links
 Draw Sheets on-line
Historical results IRF website

Racquetball World Championships
Racquetball
Racquetball  in Puerto Rico
International sports competitions hosted by Puerto Rico
2002 in Puerto Rican sports